Takovo is a village in the municipality of Ub, Serbia. According to the 2011 census, the village has a population of 883 people.

References

Populated places in Kolubara District